Radical Evolution: The Promise and Peril of Enhancing Our Minds, Our Bodies—and What It Means to Be Human is a book published in 2005 by Joel Garreau.

Summary
The book is about the march toward a potentially posthuman future in which emerging technologies will allow humans to shape their bodies and minds, or possibly destroy life on earth, or even the universe. Garreau describes these as the "GRIN" technologies: genetics, robotics, information, and nanotechnology.

See also
Technological singularity
Transhuman
Transhumanism

External links
 Garreau's website for the book
 
 

Transhumanist books
Philosophy books
2005 non-fiction books
Books by Joel Garreau
American non-fiction books
Doubleday (publisher) books
English-language books